The Ministry of Public Security (MPS) is a government ministry of the People's Republic of China responsible for public and political security. It oversees more than 1.9 million of the country's law enforcement officers and as such the vast majority of the People's Police. The MPS is a nationwide police force; however, counterintelligence and so-called "political security" remain core functions.

The ministry was established in 1949 (after the Chinese Communist Party's victory in the Chinese Civil War) as the successor to the Central Social Affairs Department and was known as "Ministry of Public Security of the Central People's Government" until 1954. Grand General Luo Ruiqing of the People's Liberation Army (PLA) was its first minister. As the ministry's organization was based on Soviet and Eastern Bloc models, it was responsible for all aspects of national security; ranging from regular police work to intelligence, counterintelligence and the suppression of anti-communist political and societal sentiments. Military intelligence affairs remained with the General Staff Department, while the International Liaison Department of the Chinese Communist Party (CCP) was active in fomenting revolutionary tendencies worldwide by funneling weapons, money and resources to various pro-CCP movements.

The ministry employs a system of Public Security Bureaus throughout the provinces, cities, municipalities and townships of China. The special administrative regions of Hong Kong and Macau maintain nominally separate police forces. The ministry is headed by the Minister of Public Security, who is nominated by the Premier of the People's Republic of China and confirmed by the National People's Congress (NPC). Wang Xiaohong has been the current minister since June 2022.

History 

The Ministry of Public Security was among the first government organs of the PRC. It superseded the Ministry of Public Security of the CCP's Central Military Commission (CMC), a transitional body created in July 1949 by removing the security service remit from the CCP's Central Social Affairs Department (SAD). The MPS began operations on 1 November 1949, at the end of a two-week-long National Conference of Senior Public Security Cadres. Most of its initial staff of less than 500 cadres came from the (former) regional CCP North China Department of Social Affairs. At the national level, its creation signaled the formal abolition of the SAD. The ministry moved to its present location, in the heart of the one-time foreign legation quarters in Beijing, in the spring of 1950.

The MPS's Guangzhou office historically handled foreign spies such as Larry Wu-tai Chin. 

With the creation of the Ministry of State Security (MSS) in July 1983, MPS lost much of its counterintelligence personnel and remit. Scholars Jichang Lulu and Filip Jirouš have argued that the establishment of the MSS "may have contributed to the illusion that the MPS is simply a law-enforcement police body, separate from intelligence agencies." According to analyst Alex Joske, "the MPS lost much of its foreign intelligence remit after the MSS's creation, but has established new units for cross-border clandestine operations since then." Since then, the MPS remains a commonly used cover by MSS officers. 

Following the 1989 Tiananmen Square protests and massacre, the MPS worked to counter Operation Yellowbird. 

The MPS and its officers have been active abroad in Operation Fox Hunt and Operation Sky Net. The MPS under Sun Lijun had reporters from The Wall Street Journal in Hong Kong under "full operational surveillance" for their reporting of the 1Malaysia Development Berhad (1MDB) scandal.

In 2017, Europol signed a "strategic cooperation agreement" with the MPS. Starting in 2019, the MPS began replacing "domestic security" with "political security" in the names of its units.

In 2022, it was reported that the MPS had established numerous overseas police service stations, which sparked investigations by law enforcement in multiple countries.

List of ministers

Organization 

The MPS is organized into functional departments (see below). Subordinate to the MPS are the provincial- and municipal-level PSB's (Public Security Bureau) and sub-bureaus at the county and urban district levels. At the grassroots level, finally, there are police stations which serve as the direct point of contact between police and ordinary citizens. While public security considerations have weighed heavily at all levels of administration since the founding of the PRC, the police are perceived by some outside observers to wield progressively greater influence at lower levels of government. Provincial public security bureaus are subject to dual supervision by both local provincial governments and the central government. The ministry is also closely associated with the development of surveillance technologies used by police in China through the Third Research Institute focused on the development of AI based “smart surveillance,” and censorship technologies.

Internal publications 

The journal Public Security Construction（）was a classified serial publication for internal purposes. During the disastrous Great Leap Forward between 1958 and 1961, the circular Public Security Work Bulletin was a top-secret serial which often described China's serious food shortages, social unrest and famine directly contradicting Mao Zedong's claims of "bountiful economic fruit". Another periodical the People's Public Security was also produced and classified as "for official use only", functioning for the purposes of internal intelligence sharing and coordination among various branches of the public security apparatus.

United front organization 
The MPS' First Bureau operates a united front organization called the China Association for Friendship.

See also 

 People's Police of the People's Republic of China
 Ministry of State Security (China)
 Public security bureau (China)
 Public Security Police Force of Macau
 Hong Kong Police Force

Notes

References

Citations

Sources 

 John Pike, Federation of American Scientists, Intelligence Resource Program, Ministry of Public Security 
 Kam C. Wong, Chinese Policing: History and Reform (N.Y.: Peter Lang, 2009)
 Kam C. Wong, Police Reform in China: A Chinese Perspective (Taylor and Francis, 2011) (July 2011)

External links 
 

Public Security
China
China
Ministries established in 1949
1949 establishments in China
Organizations based in Beijing
Law enforcement agencies of China
National Central Bureaus of Interpol
Chinese intelligence agencies